Andreas Buchwald Rechnitzer (November 30, 1924 - August 22, 2005) was an American oceanographer. With Carl Hubbs, he discovered the striped yellow butterfly fish that served as the logo of the Birch Aquarium. He helped develop the first SCUBA diving training program for ocean scientists, which included such innovations as ditch-and-don, buddy breathing, and the buddy system. He was a member of the US Navy Office of Naval Research team that negotiated the purchase of the bathyscape Trieste, and was the scientist in charge of Project Nekton in 1960, during which the Trieste entered the Challenger Deep, the deepest surveyed point in the world's oceans. For this he received the Navy Distinguished Civilian Service Award. He joined the scientific staff of the Chief of Naval Operations, where he was the Oceanographer of the Navy from 1970 to 1984, and was the Senior Scientist at Science Applications International Corporation from 1985 to 1998.

Biography
Andreas Buchwald Rechnitzer was born in on Escondido, California, on November 30, 1924. During World War II he graduated from the United States Naval Reserve Midshipmen's School at Fort Schuyler, New York, in 1945, and was commissioned as an ensign in the US Naval Reserve. He returned to college after the war and earned a Bachelor of Science degree from Michigan State University in 1947 and a Master of Science from the University of California in Los Angeles in 1951. He wrote his 1955 Doctor of Philosophy thesis on A serological approach to the systematics of the viviparous sea-perches, family Embiotocidae under the supervision of Carl Hubbs at the Scripps Institution of Oceanography. With Hubbs he discovered the striped yellow fish that served as the logo of the Birch Aquarium.

In 1950, while  still a graduate student, Rechnitzer and Conrad (Connie) Limbaugh devised the first SCUBA diving training program for ocean scientists, although the term SCUBA had not yet been coined. Their course included such innovations as ditch-and-don, buddy breathing, and the buddy system. Their equipment consisted of two Aqualung diving regulators (the third and fourth sold in the United States), a triple-tank unit, and a single tank. The were no diving instructors or diving shops, and the wet suit had yet to be invented. They drafted the first unofficial training, operational and safety procedures. Training was conducted in the swimming pool at the La Jolla Beach and Tennis Club.

After graduating from Scripps, Rechnitzer became the Deep Submergence Research Program Coordinator and Oceanographer at the Naval Electronics Laboratory in San Diego. In this role he was instrumental in persuading the US Navy to purchase the bathyscape Trieste, from Swiss physicist Auguste Piccard. For this he received the Navy Distinguished Civilian Service Award from President Dwight D. Eisenhower. He then went to Rockwell International, where he was in charge of the development of the Beaver IV submersible.

Rechnitzer left Rockwell in 1970, and became the Science and Technology Advisor in the Office of the Chief of Naval Operations. He headed the Navy's Deep Submergence Systems Division from 1970 to 1973, and then served as Oceanographer of the Navy from 1974 to 1978. He became an adjunct professor at the Naval Postgraduate School in 1977. He was also involved in the discovery of the wreck of the British Royal Mail Steamship Tweed, which sank on Scorpion Reef in 1847, and the English merchantman Holiday that sank there in 1823.

Awards Rechnitzer received included  the Academy of Underwater Arts and Sciences' NOGI Award for sciences in 1968, for distinguished Service in 1989, and for sports and education in 1999 and 2007. He is the only person to have won the NOGI award three times. He was made an honorary citizen of the city of San Diego and an honorary life member of the National Geographic Society. He was the Diego Chamber of Commerce's Outstanding Man of the Year in 1960 and 1961.

Death
Rechnitzer died at Grossmont Hospital in La Mesa, California, on August 22, 2005. He was survived by his wife Alice, daughter Andrea, and sons, David, Martin and Michael.

See also
 :Category:Taxa named by Andreas Rechnitzer

Notes

1924 births
2005 deaths
People from Escondido, California
University of California, Los Angeles alumni
Michigan State University alumni
Scripps Institution of Oceanography
Underwater divers